Ana Smerlyn Rosa García (born in 1997) is a Dominican Republic judoka. She has competed in several international judo tournaments, most notably the 2019 Pan American Games in Lima, Peru, where she won the gold  medal in the 57 kg division.

Pan American Games 
Garcia represented her native Dominican Republic at the 2019 Pan American Games held in Lima, Peru. She advanced  to her division's finals but originally lost to Brazilian competitor Rafaela Silva; Silva was, however, later found to have used fenoterol, an anabolic, during the competition and was disqualified by Pan Am Sports, the Pan Am Games' organizing association, and the gold medal was therefore transferred to Garcia.

Garcia joined Estefania Soriano and Wander Mateo as judo gold medalists from the Dominican Republic at the Pan American Games competition level.

External links 

1997 births
Living people
Judoka at the 2019 Pan American Games
Pan American Games medalists in judo
Pan American Games gold medalists for the Dominican Republic
Medalists at the 2019 Pan American Games